This is the discography of American pop rock band Sixpence None the Richer. To date, the group has released six studio albums, three compilation albums, five extended plays, and fourteen singles. They gained mainstream popularity in 1997 with their self-titled album, producing the hit single "Kiss Me", which was an international hit. The song topped the Australian charts, and reached the top five in New Zealand, the United Kingdom, and the band's native United States.

Albums

Studio albums

Compilation albums

Box sets

Extended plays

Singles

Music videos
 Angeltread (1995)
 Kiss Me (1998)
 There She Goes (1999)
 Breathe Your Name (2002)
 Don't Dream It's Over (2004)
 Angels We Have Heard on High (2008)
 Silent Night (2008)
 My Dear Machine (2008)
 Sooner Than Later (2013)
 Radio (2013)

Other appearances
Along with their albums, Sixpence has recorded a number of songs for other artists' compilation albums. The following is a list of these songs. The letter "r" denotes a remake of another artist's song.

 1994: "Bouquet" (r, Steve Taylor) - A Steve Taylor Tribute: I Predict a Clone (1994, label unknown)
 1996: "Road to Zion" (r, Petra) Never Say Dinosaur (1996, Starsong / EMD)
 1996: "You're a Mean One, Mr. Grinch" (r) - Christmas in Heaven - Flying Tart Records Presents (1996; Flying Tart Records) (later re-released on Happy Christmas Vol. 2, 1999) 
 1997: "Sad But True" - alternate track found only on the limited edition vinyl LP version of Sixpence's self-titled third album. 
 1998: "Brighten My Heart" - Exodus (1998, Rocketown Records)
 1999: "Dancing Queen" (r, ABBA) - Dick (motion picture soundtrack, Virgin Records)
 1999: "Trust 99" (LP Version) Songs From the Book (Word Entertainment)  
 1999: "Breathe" - Streams (Word Entertainment) (Later re-released on Word's 2011 compilation Songs That Defined a Decade, Vol. 3: Christian Hits of the 90's and 2013's The Iconic Groups of Christian Music) 
 2000: "With Every Breath," "You're Here" - City on a Hill: Songs of Worship and Praise (Essential Records) 
 2000: "Babe in the Straw" (Leigh Nash only) - One Silent Night (Word Entertainment)
 2000: "The Ground You Shook" - Roaring Lambs (Squint)
 2000: "I Need Love" (r, Sam Phillips) Here on Earth (motion picture soundtrack) (Sony)
 2000: "Need to Be Next to You" and "Love (Remix)" - Bounce (Music From and Inspired By the Miramax Motion Picture) (RCA Records, a division of Sony Music Entertainment) 
 2002: "Silent Night" (r, traditional) - City on a Hill: It's Christmas Time (Essential Records)
 2002: "Goodnight Children Everywhere" (r, Vera Lynn) - For the Kids (Nettwerk) 
 2003: "Christmastime is Here" (r, Vince Guaraldi) - WOW Christmas: 30 Top Christian Artists and Holiday Songs (Word Entertainment) (Later re-released on You're Here, 2009, Word) 
 2003: "I Just Wasn't Made for These Times" (r, The Beach Boys) - Making God Smile: An Artists' Tribute to the Songs of Beach Boy Brian Wilson 
 2003: "Beautiful Scandalous Night" (with Bebo Norman) (r,  The Choir) - City on a Hill: The Gathering (Essential Records)  
 2003: "On the Run" (r, Electric Light Orchestra) - Lynne Me Your Ears - A Tribute to the Music of Jeff Lynne (Not Lame Recordings)
 2003: "It Came Upon a Midnight Clear" (r, traditional) - Maybe This Christmas Too? (Nettwerk) (also released on Nettwerk's A Winter's Night in 2005, and on 2006's Christmas Present: New Holiday Traditions, Warner Music) 
 2004: "Love is Blindness" (r, U2) - In the Name of Love: Artists United for Africa (Sparrow Records) 
 2004: "Every Heartbeat" (r, Amy Grant) - Charlie Peacock: Full Circle: A Celebration of Songs and Friends (Sparrow Records)
 2008: "Carol of the Bells" (r, traditional) - What I Want for Christmas... (Nettwerk)
 2008: "Christmas for Two" - Merry Happy Christmas (Nettwerk)
 2009: "Wayfaring Stranger" (r, traditional folk) - The Village (429 Records & SLG, LLC)
 2011: "I Won't Share You" (r, The Smiths) - Please, Please, Please - A Tribute to The Smiths (American Laundromat Records)
 2012: "Angels We Have Heard on High" (r, traditional) - Isn't This World Enough?? A Nettwerk Christmas (Nettwerk)

In addition to all of the above, many songs that Sixpence had recorded for their own albums reappeared on later compilations. These include:

 1997: "Kiss Me" - Originally released on Sixpence None the Richer (album). Later appeared on:
 Lilith Fair - A Celebration of Women In Music, Vol. 3 (Live) (1999, Nettwerk)
 How to Lose a Guy In 10 Days (Music From the Motion Picture) (2003, Virgin Records America, Inc)
 WOW #1s (2005, Provident Label Group LLC, a unit of Sony Music Entertainment)
 Kiss Me - Songs of Love & Romance (2011,Word Entertainment LLC, A Warner/ Curb Company) 
 Whatever: Pop Hits of the '90s (2011, Rhino Entertainment Company, a Warner Music Group Company) 
 WORD: Six Decades of Hits (2011,Word Entertainment LLC, A Warner/ Curb Company) - This version is referred to as "Top Ten Edit."
 1997: "Love" - Originally released on Sixpence None the Richer (album). Later appeared on:
 One (2000, Word Entertainment) - This version is referred to as "Ben Grosse Remix."
 Mercy Streets Soundtrack (2000, NSoul Records) - This version is referred to as "Remix." At the time of writing, it is unknown if this is the same remix as the one listed above.
 1999: "There She Goes" (r, The Las)- Originally released on Sixpence None the Richer (album). Later appeared on:
 This Is Alice Music, Volume 7 (2003)
 2002: "Breathe Your Name" - Originally recorded for Divine Discontent. Later appeared on:
 WOW Hits 2004 (EMI Christian Music Group, Inc., Word Entertainment LLC, Provident Label Group)
 2002: "Don't Dream it's Over" (r, Crowded House) - Originally recorded for Divine Discontent. Later appeared on:
 Smallville: The Talon Mix (Original Soundtrack) (2005, Elektra)
 CrossCuts: Top Pop Hits Performed By Your Favorite Christian Artists (2008, Word Entertainment)
 2002: "Melody of You" - Originally recorded for Divine Discontent. Later appeared on:
 Felicity (Senior Year) (series soundtrack) (2002, Nettwerk Productions)
 2009: "Us" - Originally appeared on The Best of Sixpence None the Richer as a new track. Later appeared on:
 Dare to Love: Songs of Unconditional Love for Couples (2009, Word Entertainment LLC, A Warner/Curb Company)

References

External links
 Sixpence None the Richer overview at Allmusic

Discographies of American artists
Pop music group discographies
Rock music group discographies
 
 
Christian music discographies